Suplac (Hungarian pronunciation: , meaning "nice place on the river Küküllő") is a commune in Mureș County, Transylvania, Romania which is composed of five villages:

Idrifaia / Héderfája
Laslău Mare / Oláhszentlászló
Laslău Mic / Kisszentlászló
Suplac
Vaidacuta / Vajdakuta

History 

It formed part of the Székely Land region of the historical Transylvania province. Until 1918, the village belonged to the Maros-Torda County of the Kingdom of Hungary. After the Treaty of Trianon of 1920, it became part of Romania.

Economy
The Laslău Mare gas field is located in the village of Laslău Mare. It was established in 1925 and is still operational as of 2010. The estimated reserves have been quantified as 5×109m3 (176 billion cubic feet).

Demographics

The commune has a Hungarian majority. According to the 2011 census, it has a population of 2,202 of which 51.27% or 1,129 are Hungarian and 35.92% or 791 Romanians.

See also 
 List of Hungarian exonyms (Mureș County)

References

Communes in Mureș County
Localities in Transylvania